2-methylcitrate dehydratase (2-methyl-trans-aconitate forming) is an enzyme with systematic name  (2S,3S)-2-hydroxybutane-1,2,3-tricarboxylate hydro-lyase (2-methyl-trans-aconitate forming). This enzyme catalyses the following chemical reaction

 (2S,3S)-2-methylcitrate  2-methyl-trans-aconitate + H2O

References

External links 
 

EC 4.2.1